Alfred Joseph Francis "Gentleman Joe" Primeau (January 29, 1906 – May 14, 1989), was a Canadian professional ice hockey player.

Playing career
Born in Lindsay, Ontario, and raised in Victoria, British Columbia, Primeau moved to Toronto at an early age and began his professional career in 1927 with the Toronto Ravinas, an affiliate of the Toronto Maple Leafs. He became a full-time member of the Leafs in the 1929–30 season. Primeau played on the Leafs' Kid Line with Charlie Conacher and Busher Jackson. He won his only Stanley Cup as a player in 1931–32 and won the Lady Byng Memorial Trophy that same season. He retired in 1936 at age 30. Over his NHL career, Primeau scored 66 goals and 177 assists in 310 games.

Primeau was inducted into the Hockey Hall of Fame in 1963. He died in Toronto, Ontario at the age of 83. In 1998, Primeau was ranked number 92 on The Hockey News' list of the 100 Greatest Hockey Players.

Coaching career
Primeau won the Stanley Cup in his first year as head coach of the Maple Leafs in 1950–51. He is the only coach to lead teams to Memorial Cup, Allan Cup and Stanley Cup championships.

Miscellany
Following the Canada-Sweden game at the 1976 Canada Cup tournament, Primeau presented the award to the top Canadian player of the game: Bob Gainey.

Awards and achievements

Player
 1931–32 – Stanley Cup Champion – Toronto Maple Leafs
 1931–32 – Lady Byng Memorial Trophy
 1933–34 – Second Team All-Star – Centre
 1963 – Honoured member – Hockey Hall of Fame

Coach
 1946–47 – Memorial Cup Champion – Toronto St. Michael's Majors
 1949–50 – Allan Cup Champion – Toronto Marlboros
 1950–51 – Stanley Cup Champion – Toronto Maple Leafs

Career statistics

Regular season and playoffs

* Stanley Cup Champion.

Coaching record

External links
 

1906 births
1989 deaths
Canadian ice hockey coaches
Canadian ice hockey centres
Hockey Hall of Fame inductees
Ice hockey people from British Columbia
Ice hockey people from Ontario
Lady Byng Memorial Trophy winners
London Panthers players
Sportspeople from Kawartha Lakes
Sportspeople from Victoria, British Columbia
Stanley Cup champions
Stanley Cup championship-winning head coaches
Toronto Falcons (CPHL) players
Toronto Maple Leafs coaches
Toronto Maple Leafs players
Toronto Marlboros players
Toronto Ravinas players
Toronto St. Michael's Majors players